Lepidochrysops delicata is a butterfly in the family Lycaenidae. It is found in Malawi and Mozambique.

Adults migrate from November to December.

References

Butterflies described in 1923
Lepidochrysops